Frances Barber (née Brookes, born 13 May 1958) is an English actress. She received Olivier Award nominations for her work in the plays Camille (1985), and Uncle Vanya (1997). Her film appearances include three collaborations with Gary Oldman in Prick Up Your Ears (1987), We Think the World of You (1988) and Dead Fish (2005); as well as Sammy and Rosie Get Laid (1987); Soft Top Hard Shoulder (1992); and latterly Film Stars Don't Die in Liverpool (2017). Barber's numerous television credits include The Street (2009), Doctor Who (2011), and Silk (2012–2014).

Life and career
Barber was born in Wolverhampton, Staffordshire, England. Her parents are S.W. Brookes and Gladys Simpson; Barber is the fourth of six children. She attended the Wolverhampton Municipal Grammar School.

Barber studied drama at the University College of North Wales in Bangor, where she was a contemporary of director Danny Boyle, who became her boyfriend.

She appeared in the Pet Shop Boys' musical Closer to Heaven in 2001 as well as being guest singer for the song "Friendly Fire" on the Pet Shop Boys' 2006 live concert at the Mermaid Theatre. She also appeared alongside Ian McKellen and Roger Allam in the Old Vic's pantomime production of Aladdin in the 2005–2006 Christmas season. She again starred with Ian McKellen in 2007 playing Goneril in Trevor Nunn's production of King Lear and as Arkadina in Chekhov's The Seagull with the Royal Shakespeare Company in Stratford-upon-Avon followed by a world tour throughout the year. They again performed the two plays in repertory at the New London Theatre on Drury Lane, opening in November 2007 and closing mid-January 2008.

In 2011, she guest-starred in the Doctor Who episodes "A Good Man Goes to War" and "The Wedding of River Song" (and five other episodes, sometimes uncredited) as Madame Kovarian. She also acted in the television film We'll Take Manhattan as Diana Vreeland.

In 2006, she received an honorary fellowship from the University of Wolverhampton.

In 2019, she starred in the Pet Shop Boys' musical Musik.

Political views
Barber is a British unionist. She signed a letter supporting a No vote ahead of the 2014 Scottish independence referendum. After the Scottish National Party won 56 seats at the 2015 general election, she caused controversy after making comments on Twitter comparing the SNP to the Third Reich, further stating "God help us all is all I can say when the racist S.N.P. try to take over, England will react we will have civil war."

She supported Remain during the 2016 United Kingdom European Union membership referendum.

Barber urged a vote for the Labour Party at the 2017 UK general election. Critical of Labour leader Jeremy Corbyn, she said "I will vote Labour holding my nose. Urge you too." In September 2017, she resigned from the party, saying: "I can't belong to a party full of Misogyny, Anti-Semitism and Thuggery". In the 2019 United Kingdom general election, she backed the Liberal Democrats.

In 2018, she was among the signatories to a letter published in The Observer arguing that debate surrounding reforms of the Gender Recognition Act were being silenced. In September 2020, she signed a further letter in support of J.K. Rowling, against what The Scotsman described as "the abuse and death threats" Rowling had received after publicising her views.

Theatre

Ooh La La (Hull Truck Theatre, 1979)
Riff Raff Rules (Theatre Royal Stratford East)
Space Ache (Tricycle Theatre, 1980)
Emilia in Othello (Oxford Playhouse)
La Guerra (The Battle), Desperado Corner and Madame Louise (Glasgow Citizens', 1980, and Venice Biennale Festival, 1981)
The Treat (Institute of Contemporary Arts)
The Mission (Soho Poly)
Hard Feelings (Oxford Playhouse and The Bush, 1983)
Turning Over (The Bush, 1983)
Marguerite in Camille (Royal Shakespeare Company, The Other Place, 1984, and Comedy Theatre, 1985 – Olivier nomination for Most Promising Newcomer)
Ophelia in Hamlet (RSC Barbican Theatre, 1985)
Love's Labour's Lost (RSC The Other Place, Comedy Theatre, 1985)
The Dead Monkey (RSC The Pit, 1986))
Summer and Smoke (Haymarket Theatre)
Viola in Twelfth Night (Renaissance, Riverside Studios, 1987)
Lady Macbeth in Macbeth (Royal Exchange, Manchester, 1988)
My Heart's a Suitcase (Royal Court, 1990)
Over a Barrel (Watford Palace Theatre)
Imagine Drowning (Hampstead Theatre, 1991)
Maxine Faulk in The Night of the Iguana (National Theatre, 1992)
Eliza Doolittle in Pygmalion (National Theatre, 1992)
Insignificance (Donmar Warehouse, 1995)
Uncle Vanya (Minerva Theatre, Chichester and Albery Theatre, 1996 – TMA Award and Olivier nomination for Best Supporting Actress)
Closer (Lyric Theatre, National Theatre West End transfer, 1998)
Billie Trix in Closer to Heaven (Arts Theatre, 2001)
Valerie in Tales from the Vienna Woods (National Theatre, 2003)
Nurse Ratched in One Flew Over the Cuckoo's Nest (Gielgud Theatre, 2004)
Dim Sum in Aladdin (Old Vic pantomime, 2005)
The Narrator in Shane Cullinan's The Pieta St Paul's, Covent Garden, 2006)
Cleopatra in Antony and Cleopatra (Shakespeare's Globe, London, 2006)
Arkadina in The Seagull and Goneril in King Lear (RSC, Courtyard Theatre Stratford-upon-Avon, and New London Theatre, 2007)
Madame de Sade (Donmar West End, Wyndham's Theatre, 2009)
Afterplay (Edinburgh Festival, then Gate Theatre, Dublin, 2009)
Julius Caesar (Donmar Theatre, 2012–2013)
Lady Sneerwell in The School for Scandal (Lucille Lortel Theatre, New York City, 2016)
Mrs Cheveley in An Ideal Husband (Vaudeville Theatre, London, May 2018)
Billie Trix in Musik (Edinburgh Festival Fringe, August 2019 & Leicester Square Theatre, London, September 2019 and February 2020)

Polonius in Hamlet (Theatre Royal Windsor, 2021)
Elsa Jean Krakowski in The Unfriend (Chichester Festival Theatre, Chichester, 2022 and The Criterion, London, 2023)

Selected filmography

The Missionary (1982) as Mission Girl
A Flame to the Phoenix (1983) as Wanda Grabinska
Acceptable Levels (1985) as Jill
A Zed & Two Noughts (1985) as Venus de Milo
White City (1985) as Alice
Castaway (1986) as Sister Saint Winifred
Prick Up Your Ears (1987) as Leonie Orton
Sammy and Rosie Get Laid (1987) as Rosie Hobbs
We Think the World of You (1988) as Megan
Victim of the Brain (1988)
Twelfth Night (1988, TV Movie) as Viola / Cesario
Chambre à part (1989) as Gert
Behaving Badly (1989, TV Mini-Series) as Rebecca
Red Dwarf (1989, Episode: "Polymorph") as Genny
Agatha Christie's Poirot (1990, Episode: "The Veiled Lady") as Lady Millicent
Young Soul Rebels (1991) as Ann
Secret Friends (1991) as Angela
Inspector Morse (1992, TV Series, Episode: "The Death of the Self") as Nicole Burgess
Soft Top Hard Shoulder (1992) as Miss Trumble
The Leaving of Liverpool (1992, TV Movie) as Ellen, Lily's mother
The Inspector Alleyn Mysteries (1993, Episode: "Scales of Justice"
Du fond du coeur (1994) as Anna Lindsay
Giorgino (1994) as Marie
Space Precinct (1995, TV Series) as Erika Brandt
Rhodes (1996, TV Mini-Series) as Princess Catherine Radziwill
The Ice House (1997, TV Mini-Series) as Diana Goode
Photographing Fairies (1997) as Beatrice Templeton
A Royal Scandal (1997, TV Movie) as Lady Jersey
Dalziel and Pascoe (1998, Episode: "The Wood Beyond") as Amanda 'Cap' Marvell
Still Crazy (1998) as Lady in Black
Murder Most Horrid (1999, TV Series) as Gloria Twigge
Mauvaise passe (1999) as Jessica
Bremner, Bird and Fortune (1999, TV Series)
Esther Kahn (2000) as Rivka Kahn
Shiner (2000) as Georgie
Superstition (2001) as Isabella Flores
Gimme Gimme Gimme (2001) as Janine
Manchild (2002, TV Series) as Elizabeth
The Red Siren (2002) as Eva
24 heures de la vie d'une femme (2002) as Betty
Flyfishing (2002) as Frances
My Family (2003, TV Series) as Vanessa
Boudica (2003) as Agrippina
Monkey Dust (2003, TV Series) (voice)
Suzie Gold (2004) as Joyce Spencer
Evilenko (2004)
Goal! (2005) as Carol Harmison
Dead Fish (2005) as S & M Prostitute
Agatha Christie's Marple (2005, Episode: "A Murder Is Announced") as Lizzie Hinchcliffe
Funland (2005, TV Mini-Series) as Connie Woolf
The IT Crowd (2006, Episode: "Aunt Irma Visits") as Doctor Mendall
New Tricks (2006, Episode: "Dockers") as Anita Walsh
Goal II: Living the Dream (2007) as Carol Harmison
Hustle (2007, TV Series) as Clarissa
Beautiful People (2008, TV Series) as Miss Prentice
King Lear (2008, TV Movie) as Goneril
Agatha Christie's Poirot (2009, Episode: “The Clocks”) as Merlina Rival
The Fattest Man in Britain (2009, TV Movie) as Janice
The Royal (2009)
Midsomer Murders (2010, Episode: "Master Class") as Constance Fielding
Doctor Who (2011, TV Series) as Eye Patch Lady / Madame Kovarian
Great Expectations (2011, TV Mini-Series) as Mrs. Brandley
Friday Night Dinner (2011, TV Series) as Sheila Bloom
We'll Take Manhattan (2012, TV Movie) as Diana Vreeland
May I Kill U? (2012) as Bernice
Vexed (2012, TV Series) as Pat Poynter
Silk (2012–2014, TV Series) as Caroline Warwick QC
The Life of Rock with Brian Pern (2014, TV Series)
Mapp and Lucia (2014, TV Mini-Series) as Amelia, Contessa Di Faraglione
Mr. Holmes (2015) as Matinee 'Madame Schirmer'
Benidorm (2016, TV Series) as Daisy
The Chosen (2016) as Natalia Sedova
Medici: Masters of Florence (2016, TV Series) as Piccarda
Father Brown (2017, Episode: “The Labyrinth of the Minotaur”) as Davina Malmort
Midsomer Murders (2017, Episode: "Crime and Punishment") as Ingrid Lockston
Film Stars Don't Die in Liverpool (2017) as Joy
The Escape (2017) as Alison
The Bookshop (2017) as Jessie
An Ideal Husband (2018) as Mrs. Cheveley
Blue Iguana (2018) as Princess
The Queen and I (2018, TV Movie) as Margaret
Queens of Mystery as Viv Collins (2 episodes "Death by Vinyl")
Casualty (2019, TV Series) as Claire Wakelins
Cold Feet (2020) as Maxine Ibsen
 Whitstable Pearl (2021, TV Series) as Dolly Nolan The Mezzotint as Mrs AmbrigailThe Chelsea Detective (two episodes 2022, TV Series) as Olivia ArnoldA Bird Flew In'' (TBA)

Music video

See also
 List of people from Wolverhampton

References

External links

1958 births
Living people
English film actresses
English stage actresses
English television actresses
English musical theatre actresses
English voice actresses
English Shakespearean actresses
English expatriates in Spain
Royal Shakespeare Company members
actors from Wolverhampton
Alumni of Bangor University
20th-century English actresses
21st-century English actresses